The Hindu–German Conspiracy Trial commenced in the District Court in San Francisco on November 12, 1917,  following the uncovering of the :Hindu–German Conspiracy (also known as the Indo German plot) for initiating a revolt in India. It was part of a wave of such incidents which took place in the United States after America's entrance into World War I.

In May 1917, eight Indian nationalists of the Ghadar Party were indicted by a federal grand jury  on a charge of conspiracy to form a military enterprise against the United Kingdom. The trial lasted from November 20, 1917, to April 24, 1918. The British authorities hoped that the conviction of the Indians would result in their deportation from the United States back to India. However, strong public support in favor of the Indians meant that the U.S. Department of Justice chose not to do so.

Background

From 1915 to 1917, the British government repeatedly requested that the United States government suppress the activities of Ghadar Party in the USA.  However, these requests were turned down, as nothing in U.S. law prevented the Indians from seeking to overthrow the British government. The British ambassador, Cecil Spring Rice, was reluctant to press the matter diplomatically, fearing the political fallout at a time when Britain was working to end US neutrality and bring it into the war on the side of the Allies. Shortly before the outbreak of World War I, the Ghadar intellectual, Lala Hardayal, was arrested for anarchist activities and left the U.S. before he could be deported. With other Indian Nationalists in Europe, he enlisted the aid of Germany, who believed supporting a revolt in India would weaken the United Kingdom. In 1915, Germany offered the Indian Nationalists financial aid for transporting arms and Indians back to India via the United States.

The British government claimed that the United States was violating its neutrality with Britain by allowing Germany to conspire with the Indians on American soil. The first of several arrests of the Indian Nationalists were made in the Spring of 1917 with one hundred and five people of various nationalities being arrested. Eventually, thirty-five were tried for conspiracy, including nine Germans, nine Americans, and seventeen Indians.

During the war, nativists in the United States were expressing hostility toward certain minority groups, especially radicals and recent immigrants viewing anything un-American with suspicion. By 1917, Germans were the object of much of the American nativistic fervor. Fear of German subversion and conspiracies ran rampant throughout the U.S. after the Black Tom explosion and the Kingsland Explosion, both suspected to have been caused by German agents. Thus by being linked to Germany in a conspiracy, the Indian Nationalists should have been the recipients of the same hostility. Although calls for their deportation were made by government officials after the Hindu-German conspiracy trial, none of the Indian Nationalists were deported.

The arrests
The arrests started in March 1917, with Chandra Kanta Chakraverty "a thin-faced, falsetto-voiced Hindu, a native of Bengal, and a speaker of many languages", and the German, Ernst Sekunna, being arrested on charges of conspiracy. Most of the others were arrested on April 8, including Franz Bopp, the German Consul General for San Francisco, E. H. von Schack, Deus Dekker and Wilhelm von Brincken. The Indian Nationalists were accused of taking "advantage of American neutrality to plot on American soil against the allies" at "the expense of the laws and hospitality of the United States". The two men had also taken out trade names to do business as The Oriental Society, The Oriental Kitchen,and the Oriental Review, and purchased  of land in an isolated part of New York State.

The trial

The Hindu German conspiracy trial started in San Francisco on November 20, 1917. Despite attempts to focus on the machinations of the German agents, the Indians presented their position in terms of the ideals of the American Revolution. As the trial started, Jodh Singh, an Indian "whose testimony sent nine men, including his brothers to their death and condemned a score to life imprisonment in the Far East," pleaded with the court for an American square deal. The British had brought Singh to the United States to testify against his fellow Indian Nationalists. He pleaded guilty to the conspiracy charges and was to be a government witness in this trial. But when he took the witness stand, he suddenly refused to testify.  He asked to change his plea to stand trial with his "brothers" in an American court. The judge refused his request.

The San Francisco Chronicle described the courtroom during the testimony of one of the Government witnesses:

The Indians were placed into custody for the remainder of the trial following claims that they had been harassing witnesses by following them and attempting to bribe them. When Dr. Chakraverty's extensive confession was delivered, "the diminutive Hindoo was the target for dark glances from this fellow defendants, the subject of excited whisperings and the recipient of several notes from the Hindoos." One of the defendants even stuffed a wad of paper down Chakraverty's neck. To these notes and "to the dark scowls of his countrymen, Chakraverty responded with a broad grin." Chakraverty was followed by several of the Hindu defendants when he left court.

A woman who gave evidence in the trial described how she had met two of the Ghadar activists, Taraknath Das and Lala Hardayal, when all three were at Stanford University. One wanted to "transform her into a modern Joan of Arc, leading the Indians in intrigue against the British." The other wished to "inspire her to be an idealist and a teacher in India." Evidence was also produced of money paid to two American women by HarDayal in an attempt to "lure women to Europe to assist the revolutionists." The prosecution also suggested that Taraknath Das had used Camille de Berri, to store a bomb manual in her safety deposit box. When she was finally located she was revealed to be the Oakland divorcee of a wealthy mining expert and who had recently remarried.  Her new husband had been suspended from the University of California, upon graduating, for petty pilfering from gymnasium lockers.  De Berri had come to his rescue by heading a special investigating committee to look into the affair and then by testifying as an alibi witness for him.

The defense attorney attempted to argue the accuseds' beliefs placed them squarely within American ideals. The opening address to the jury denounced the British Government's rule in India, declaring that the whole case was being tried at the initiation of Britain. Copies of Ram Chandra's Ghadar Party paper were produced quoting liberty appeals by Patrick Henry, George Washington, Abraham Lincoln, and President Woodrow Wilson.

The trial ended with a sensational climax when Ram Chandra was shot to death in the courtroom by fellow defendant, Ram Singh. The New York Times described the incident, which occurred just after the court announced a recess:

Chandra had been murdered because it was believed he had been diverting Nationalists' funds to his own use. A week later, the judge found the defendants guilty of violating the neutrality of the United States. The Indians, "students and revolutionists, several of them highly educated" were sentenced to serve from twenty-two months to sixty days."

See also
 George Rodiek

References

Resources
Gower, Karla K.,  "The Hindu-German Conspiracy: An Examination of the Framing of Indian Nationalists in Newspapers from 1915-1918"

External links

"Secrets Of The Master Spy", September 1932, Popular Mechanics
 "Tragic Climax in Trial of Hindus", Norwich Bulletin. (Norwich, Conn.), 24 April 1918. Chronicling America: Historic American Newspapers. Library of Congress.
 "Jury Convicts 29 Tried for Plotting", Evening Star. (Washington, D.C.), 24 April 1918. Chronicling America: Historic American Newspapers. Library of Congress.
"Hindu Pawns Lost in Kaiser's Game of Empire", New-York Tribune. (New York [N.Y.]), 28 April 1918. Chronicling America: Historic American Newspapers. Library of Congress.

20th-century American trials
Ghadar Party
Trial
Indian-American history
Indian independence movement
1917 in California
United States in World War I